Casciana Terme Lari is a comune (municipality) in the Province of Pisa in the Italian region Tuscany, located about  southwest of Florence and about  southeast of Pisa.

Geography 
Casciana Terme Lari borders the following municipalities: Capannoli, Cascina, Chianni, Crespina Lorenzana, Santa Luce, Ponsacco, Pontedera, Terricciola.

Subdivisions 
The municipality is composed by twelve frazioni (towns and villages):

 Casciana Alta
 Casciana Terme
 Ceppato
 Cevoli
 Collemontanino
 Lari (municipal seat)
 Lavaiano
 Parlascio
 Perignano
 Sant'Ermo
 San Ruffino
 Usigliano

History 
The municipality of Casciana Terme Lari was created on 1 January 2014 by merging the former municipalities of Casciana Terme and Lari. The municipal seat is in Lari.

References